George Leslie Clark (2 September 1898 – 24 October 1978) was  a former Australian rules footballer who played with Richmond in the Victorian Football League (VFL).

Notes

External links 

1898 births
1978 deaths
Australian rules footballers from Victoria (Australia)
Richmond Football Club players